Xenodusa is a genus of rove beetles in the family Staphylinidae. There are about five described species in Xenodusa.

Species
These five species belong to the genus Xenodusa:
 Xenodusa angusta (Fall, 1901) i c g
 Xenodusa caseyi Wasmann, 1897 i c g
 Xenodusa cava (LeConte, 1863) i c g b
 Xenodusa reflexa (Walker, 1866) i c g b
 Xenodusa sharpi Wasmann, 1896 i c g
Data sources: i = ITIS, c = Catalogue of Life, g = GBIF, b = Bugguide.net

References

Further reading

External links

 

Aleocharinae
Articles created by Qbugbot